Natalia Nasaridze (born 2 October 1972) is a three-time European champion archer, who competes internationally for Turkey.

She is from the Republic of Georgia. She is coached by Vladimir Lekveshivili and is a member of Antalya Specialization Club.

International achievements

Olympics
Nasaridze represented  Turkey at the 1992, 1996, 2000 and 2004 Summer Olympics.  In these events, she placed 15th, 21st, 17th, and 49th respectively.

During the 1996 Summer Olympics, on July 29, 1996 she broke the Olympic record by scoring 168 points in an 18 arrow match.

In 2004, she placed 16th in the women's individual ranking round with a 72-arrow score of 639.  In the first round of elimination, she faced 49th-ranked Mari Piuva of Finland.  Nasaridze lost in a close upset 136-133 in the 18-arrow match, placing 49th overall in women's individual archery. She was also a member of the 10th-place Turkish women's archery team.

General
 1990, Barcelona, Spain - European championship:  (for USSR).
 1995 - World championship: 
 1996, Kranjska Gora, Slovenia - European championship: 
 1997 - Mediterranean Games Bari, Italy: 
 1997 - World championship: 
 2000 - European championship: 
 2000 - Indoors European championship: 
 2003, France - Indoors World Championship: 28th
 2003, Croatia - Grand Prix: 20th
 2003, France - Grand Prix: 30th
 2003, Turkey - Golden Arrow Grand Prix: 28th
 2003, United States - World championship: 16th (qualifier for 2004 Summer Olympics) 
 2003, Greece - International archery tournament: 
 2004, Italy - Grand Prix: 25th
 2004, Belgium - European championship: 48th
 2004, Germany - Grand Prix: 75th

References

1972 births
Living people
Turkish female archers
Olympic archers of Turkey
Naturalized citizens of Turkey
Turkish people of Georgian descent
Archers at the 1992 Summer Olympics
Archers at the 1996 Summer Olympics
Archers at the 2000 Summer Olympics
Archers at the 2004 Summer Olympics
Georgian emigrants to Turkey
Mediterranean Games gold medalists for Turkey
Competitors at the 1997 Mediterranean Games
Mediterranean Games medalists in archery